Robert Wilson "Trae" Golden (born October 5, 1991) is an American professional basketball player for the Beijing Royal Fighters of the Chinese Basketball Association (CBA). He competed in college for Tennessee and Georgia Tech.

On July 9, 2017 he signed with ESSM Le Portel of the French Pro A league. On June 10, 2018, Golden was announced by Avtodor of the Russian VTB United League. He spent the 2019–20 season with Bahçeşehir Koleji, averaging 23.0 points, 4.3 rebounds and 7.8 assists per game. On September 30, 2020, Golden signed with the Fujian Sturgeons.

Career statistics

CBA statistics 

|-
| align="left" | 2020–21
| align="left" | Fujian
| 41 || 34 || 29.6 || .518 || .430 || .884 || 4.5 || 8.1 || 0.9 || 0.0 || 30.4
|-
| align="left" | 2021–22
| align="left" | Fujian
| 20 || 20 || 39.4 || .478 || .344 || .958 || 5.7 || 9.5 || 1.1 || 0.0 || 44.1
|}
Source: basketball-stats.de (Date: 27. March 2022)

External links

Trae Golden at basketball-stats.de

References

External links
Tennessee Volunteers bio

1991 births
Living people
American expatriate basketball people in Cyprus
American expatriate basketball people in France
American expatriate basketball people in Finland
American expatriate basketball people in Italy
American expatriate basketball people in Russia
American expatriate basketball people in Turkey
American men's basketball players
Bahçeşehir Koleji S.K. players
Basketball players from Atlanta
BC Avtodor Saratov players
ESSM Le Portel players
Georgia Tech Yellow Jackets men's basketball players
Kobrat players
Shooting guards
Tennessee Volunteers basketball players